The Villa Elfvik nature house is an environmental education centre in Espoo, Finland, directed at all residents of Espoo. The nature house offers information about nature and the environment in all forms.

Jugend style Villa Elfvik was designed by the architect Mauritz Gripenberg. The construction project finished in 1904. The villa was built to be a home for baroness Elvira Standertskjöld.

Villa Elfvik is located in Laajalahti near the seashore, between the commercial centres of Tapiola and Leppävaara.

References

External links
 
 Villa Elfvik nature house, City of Espoo.
 Pictures from the Villa Elfvik area

Buildings and structures in Espoo
Nature centers
Tourist attractions in Uusimaa
Environment of Finland
Education in Uusimaa